The UTEP Miners basketball team plays for University of Texas at El Paso in El Paso, Texas. The team is an NCAA Division I men's college basketball team competing in the Conference USA. Home games are played at Don Haskins Center.

History

1966 Texas Western basketball team

As Texas Western, the Miners won the 1966 NCAA Division I men's basketball tournament. The 72–65 victory over Kentucky in College Park, Maryland is considered one of the most important in the history of college basketball, as it marked the first time that a team with five African-American starters won a title game. It came against a Kentucky team that had no African-American players, during the period of the Civil Rights Movement.

The title team has been chronicled throughout the American media, including the book And the Walls Came Tumbling Down by Frank Fitzpatrick in 1999 and the 2006 Disney movie Glory Road.

The team was inducted into the Naismith Memorial Basketball Hall of Fame in 2007.

Postseason

NCAA tournament results
The Miners have appeared in 17 NCAA Tournaments and were the 1966 National Champions. Their combined record is 14–16.

 Received a first round bye in 1984.

NIT results
The Miners have appeared in ten National Invitation Tournaments. Their combined record is 6–10.

CBI results
The Miners have appeared in three College Basketball Invitationals. Their combined record is 4–4 and they advanced to the finals in the 2009 tournament.

The Basketball Classic results
The Miners have appeared in The Basketball Classic one time. Their record is 1–1.

Miners in the NBA
17 former UTEP players have played at least one game in the NBA.

Miners in international professional basketball

 McKenzie Moore (born 1992), in the Israeli Basketball Premier League

 Randy Culpepper, currently plays for Scafati Basket of the Italian Serie A2 Basketball League.

Retired numbers

UTEP has retired five jersey numbers for seven different players.

Basketball Hall of Fame
Don Haskins
Nate Archibald
1966 National Championship team
Nolan Richardson
 Jareica Hughes
 Tim Hardaway

Don Haskins Center

The Don Haskins Center (Capacity 11,892), the home of UTEP Miners basketball. With fans seated extremely close to the playing floor and the UTEP student section located near the opponent's bench, "The Don" is so notorious as a tough place for opponents to win that UTEP has historically had difficulty convincing top-rated teams to play there. The highest ranked team (#5) to lose in the Haskins Center which was known at the time as the Special Events Center, was Georgetown (coached by John Thompson), who lost 78–64 in December, 1985. "The Don" is the home of the UTEP Miners, who were the first Division 1 Men's National Basketball Champions in the State of Texas (1966). (Previous home was Memorial Gym.)

References

External links